Mister K is a Spanish comic magazine published from October 2004 to December 2006. It was directed by Maikel and its intended audience was children and teenagers. It lasted 55 issues. Each issue featured strips and jokes about an unified theme (from mobile phones to films such as Madagascar). Among the series published were Carlitos Fax, by Albert Monteys (about a selfish robot in a retrofuturistic world who wants to be a journalist) and Harry Pórrez, by Bernardo Vergara/EnriqueCarlos/Víctor Rivas (a Harry Potter parody)

Trajectory
The first issue was launched on October, 2004. It was free alongside Metro newspaper or a special number of El Jueves. All the other issues had 56 pages and were sold for 1,20 €.

In 2005 it won the prize for best comic newspaper at Barcelona International Comic Fair.

The last issue was the 55th in December, 2006.

References

2004 establishments in Spain
2006 disestablishments in Spain
Magazines established in 2004
Magazines disestablished in 2006
Newspaper supplements
Defunct magazines published in Spain
Comics magazines published in Spain
Spanish-language magazines
Monthly magazines published in Spain
Weekly magazines published in Spain